Posavec may refer to:

 Posavec, Slovenia, a village near Radovljica
 Posavec (surname), a Croatian surname

See also
 Posavac, a horse breed